Flopristin is a semi-synthetic antibiotic of the streptogramin A class.  It is a fluorinated derivative of pristinamycin IIB.

Flopristin is one of the components of the experimental drug NXL103.

References

Macrolide antibiotics
Oxazoles
Organofluorides